Amber River is a stream in Alberta, Canada.

Amber River was so named on account of its amber-coloured water.

See also
List of rivers of Alberta

References

Rivers of Alberta